Pratibandh is a 1990 Hindi-language action film directed by Ravi Raja Pinisetty and starring Chiranjeevi, Juhi Chawla and Rami Reddy. The film marked the Bollywood debut of leading Telugu film star Chiranjeevi. Juhi Chawla received a Best Actress nomination at the 36th Filmfare Awards for her performance in the film. This film is a remake of the Telugu film Ankusam, starring Rajasekhar, directed by Kodi Rama Krishna.

Plot
Chiranjeevi plays a hard nosed, honest cop, Inspector Siddant, who fights for his beliefs. He gets in trouble with the villain (Rami Reddy) when he first refuses his bribe and then protects a witness to his crimes, Shanthi (Juhi Chawla). His guru (J. V. Somayajulu) becomes a minister and stands in the way of the villains. Because Siddanth spoils their assassination attempts and kills one of Rami Reddy's henchmen, Rami Reddy kills Shanthi, Siddant's wife. In a last attempt to save his guru as well as to prove to him that the other police officers and Reddy were trying to kill him, Siddanth lights the very torch, which is placed with explosives, that his guru was supposed to and dies.

Songs
"Kabhi Hua Nahi Kabhi Dekha Nahi" - Amit Kumar, Alka Yagnik
"Pyar Mujhe Tum Karte Ho Itna" - Alka Yagnik, Amit Kumar
"Baccho Bajao Tali Aayi Khilone Wali" - Alka Yagnik
"Yeh Badnaseeb Bachcha" - Mohammad Aziz

Cast
 Chiranjeevi as Siddhanth 
 Juhi Chawla as Shanti
 Rami Reddy as "Spot" Nana
 Harish Patel as Katkar
 J. V. Somayajulu as Chief Minister Satyendra Sharma
 Kulbhushan Kharbanda as Home Minister
 Shafi Inamdar as Corrupt Police Official
 Reema Lagoo as Court Judge
 Allu Sirish as child artist
 Sumalatha as Naseem

Awards
36th Filmfare Awards:

Nominated
 Best Film – Allu Aravind
 Best Director – Ravi Raja Pinisetty
 Best Actor – Chiranjeevi
 Best Actress – Juhi Chawla
 Best Supporting Actor – Rami Reddy

External links

1990 films
1990s Hindi-language films
Hindi remakes of Telugu films
1990s action films
Films scored by Laxmikant–Pyarelal
Geetha Arts films
Films directed by Ravi Raja Pinisetty